Attorney General Walker may refer to:

Clifford Walker (1877–1954), Attorney General of Georgia
Henry N. Walker (1811–1886), Attorney General of Michigan
Robert Walker (Canadian politician) (1916–1989), Attorney General of Saskatchewan
Sir Samuel Walker, 1st Baronet (1832–1911), Attorney-General for Ireland
Thomas Walker (Australian politician) (1858–1932), Attorney General of Western Australia

See also
General Walker (disambiguation)